Birudur is a village located in the Vandavasi taluk of Tiruvanamalai district in the state of Tamil Nadu, in South India.

Location 

Birudur is located at State Highway 115, between Vandavasi and Melmaruvathur. It is just 3 km away from Vandavasi and well connected to Chennai(113 km) by road.

Demographics 

As per 2001 India census, Birudur had a population of 1521 living in 364 households. Birudur had a sex ratio (No of females/1000 males) of 1012 (Child Sex ratio is 1231), higher than national average of 944. Jainism & Hinduism are the main religions followed here.

See also 
 Tamil Jain

External links 

Villages in Tiruvannamalai district